Justice Baharul Islam (1 March 1918 – 5 February 1993) was an Indian politician and judge of the Supreme Court of India. He was elected to the Rajya Sabha, upper house of the Parliament of India as a member of the Indian National Congress and in 1972 he resigned from the Rajya Sabha to become a judge in the Gauhati High Court after he retired as chief Justice of the Gauhati High Court he was recalled and made a Judge of the Supreme court. He gave a Judgement in the case absolving the then Congress Bihar Chief Minister Jagannath Mishra in the urban cooperative bank scandal and later resigned from the Supreme court to contest elections as a Congress party candidate and was elected to the Rajya Sabha.

Early life
Born at village Udiana PS Rangia in district of Kamrup, Assam, and educated at Gurdon High School.

Education
Educated at Gurdon High School, Nalbari, District Kamrup, Assam, Cotton College, Gauhati and Aligarh Muslim University.

Career
He enrolled as an Advocate of the Assam High Court in 1951 and as an Advocate of the Supreme Court in 1958. He joined the Indian National Congress party in 1956  and was elected to the Rajya Sabha in 1962 and for a second term in 1968 as a member of the party. He resigned from the Rajya Sabha in 1972 and was appointed Judge of the then Assam and Nagaland High Court (Now Gauhati High Court) on 20 January 1972 . He was appointed acting Chief Justice of the Gauhati High Court on 11.3.1979 and became the Chief Justice of the Gauhati High Court on 7 July 1979, he retired on 1 March 1980. He was appointed to the Supreme Court of India on 4 December 1980 which was unprecedented as a retired judge is normally not appointed to the Supreme court and further he could retire after only fifteen months.  He resigned from the Supreme Court on 12 January 1983 to contest from Barpeta, Assam to the Lok Sabha as a Congress party candidate  however as elections in Assam were postponed in the 1984 Indian general election, he was elected as a Rajya Sabha .

He was a member of, but did not serve as the president of the Gauhati High Court Bar Association.

Committees
In 1987 Justice Baharul Islam committee was appointed to draft the legislation emphasizing the rights, equal opportunities, and full participation of disabled persons.

References 

Aligarh Muslim University alumni
Faculty of Law, Aligarh Muslim University alumni
Justices of the Supreme Court of India
20th-century Indian judges
1918 births
1993 deaths
Rajya Sabha members from Assam
Indian National Congress politicians from Assam
People from Kamrup district